Juliette Gordon Low ( Gordon; October 31, 1860 – January 17, 1927) was the American founder of Girl Scouts of the USA. Inspired by the work of Lord Baden-Powell, founder of Scout Movement, she joined the Girl Guide movement in England, forming her own group of Girl Guides there in 1911.

In 1912 she returned to the States, and the same year established the first U.S. Girl Guide troop in Savannah, Georgia. In 1915, the United States' Girl Guides became known as the Girl Scouts, and Juliette Gordon Low was the first ever leader. She remained active until the time of her death.

Her birthday, October 31, is celebrated each year by the Girl Scouts as "Founder's Day".

Early life
Juliette Magill Kinzie Gordon was born on October 31, 1860, in Savannah, Georgia. She was named after her grandmother, Juliette Augusta Magill Kinzie, and nicknamed Daisy, a common sobriquet at the time, by her uncle. She was the second of six children born to William Washington Gordon II, a cotton broker with the firm Tison & Gordon, which was later renamed to W. W. Gordon & Company, and Eleanor "Nellie" Lytle Kinzie, a writer whose family played a role in the founding of Chicago.

When she was six months old, her father joined the Confederate States Army to fight in the American Civil War. In 1864, due to the close proximity of Union troops to Savannah, she moved with her mother and two sisters to Thunderbolt, Georgia. After the Union victory in Savannah the same year, her family received many visits from General William T. Sherman, who was a friend of her uncle. Sherman arranged an escort to take her family to Chicago in March 1865. Upon arriving in Chicago, Gordon Low became sick with brain fever, although she recovered without severe complications. A few months later, after President Andrew Johnson issued the amnesty proclamation, her father reunited with the family to move back to Savannah.

As a young child, she was accident-prone and had numerous injuries and illnesses. In 1866, her mother mentioned in a letter that "Daisy fell out of bed – on her head, as usual...." That same year, she broke two of her fingers so severely that her parents considered having them amputated. She also had frequent earaches and recurring bouts of malaria.

Juliette developed partial hearing loss as a child before becoming deaf in both ears due to an untreated infection and a small grain of rice.

Hobbies 
As a girl, she spent more time on art and poetry than on school work. In addition to writing and performing plays, she started a newspaper with her cousins, called The Malbone Bouquet, which featured some of her early poetry. She also formed The Helpful Hands Club with her cousins, with the goal of helping others. The members learned to sew and tried to make clothes for the children of Italian immigrants. She was dubbed "Crazy Daisy" by her family and friends, due to her eccentricities. As her cousin Caroline described her, "While you never knew what she would do next, she always did what she made up her mind to do."

Education 
Juliette's parents raised her with traditional Southern values, emphasizing the importance of duty, obedience, loyalty, and respect. By the age of 12, she had begun boarding school, attending several different ones during her teen years, including Miss Emmett's School in New Jersey, the Virginia Female Institute, the Edgehill School, and Mesdemoiselles Charbonniers, a French finishing school in New York. While studying at Edgehill, she joined the secret group Theta Tau (based on the sorority of the same name), whose members held meetings and earned badges. In 1880, after finishing boarding school, Juliette took painting lessons in New York, with teachers including Robert Walter Weir, a prominent landscape painter.

Personal life

Marriage
After the death of her sister Alice, in 1880, Juliette relocated to Savannah to take over household duties while her mother grieved. During this period, she met William Mackay Low, the son of a family friend, and they began courting in secret. William left Savannah to study at the University of Oxford, and they didn't meet again until almost three years later, in 1884. Juliette had traveled to Europe in the interim and learned several new skills, including shorthand, bareback riding, and hunting partridge. In late 1885, William proposed marriage.

The Lows' wedding in Savannah on December 21, 1886 coincided with her parents' wedding anniversary. The couple honeymooned at St. Catherines Island near Savannah. Then they leased property in London and Scotland, spending the social season in London and the hunting season in Scotland. They spent much of their first two years of marriage apart, due to her medical problems and his long hunting trips and gambling. The long separations, combined with her inability to bear children strained their relationship.

Juliette Gordon Low often painted, but also learned woodworking and metalworking. She even designed and built iron gates for her home in Warwickshire. As a host, she held parties and events at the house and also received visits from such illustrious guests as her husband's friend Albert Edward, the Prince of Wales and the writer Rudyard Kipling, whose wife was related to her mother. Despite her husband's opposition, she devoted time to charity work, including regular visits to a woman with leprosy; she also fed and cared for the poor in a nearby village, and joined the local nursing association.

Separation
By 1895, Gordon Low was growing increasingly unhappy in her marriage. She rarely spent time alone with her husband, who had grown distant and began having affairs and drinking heavily.

In 1901, Anna Bridges Bateman, the widow of Sir Hugh Alleyne Sacheverell-Bateman, stayed as a guest at the Lows' home in Scotland. Upon discovering her husband's affair with Bateman, Gordon Low left to stay with friends and family. She worried that he planned to divorce her, so she sent him a telegram asking for a year before making any final decisions. Although he didn't initially favor divorce or separation, he wrote Juliette a year later to ask that they live apart permanently, and she agreed.

William soon began withholding money from Juliette unless she agreed to a divorce. After consulting a lawyer, she learned that for a divorce to be granted, she would need to prove adultery and desertion, or adultery and cruelty. In the case of adultery, Bateman would need to be named, which would have social repercussions for all parties involved. This slowed the divorce proceedings.

In late 1902, Gordon Low received money from her husband for the first time in two years. She used it and her savings to rent a house in London. William committed to a support agreement in 1903, which was to award her 2,500 pounds a year, the Low home in Savannah, and stocks and securities. Later that year, she purchased her own home in London, along with the house next door, which she rented out for income.

After her husband suffered what may have been a stroke, Gordon Low temporarily called off the dissolution of their marriage. She considered it wrong to divorce him when he could not defend himself; the proceedings resumed in January 1905 once his condition improved. William died from a seizure in Wales on June 8, 1905, before the divorce was finalized. After the funeral, it was revealed that he had left almost everything to Bateman, and that he had revoked his 1903 support deal with Juliette. William's sisters contested the will, with the support of Gordon Low, who ultimately received a sum of money, the Low house in Savannah with its surrounding land, and stocks and securities.

Girl Guides
After her husband's death, Gordon Low traveled, took sculpting classes, and did charity work while looking for a project on which focus her time and skills. In May 1911, she met Sir Robert Baden-Powell at a party, and was inspired by the Boy Scouts, a program that he had organized. With 40,000 members throughout Europe and the United States, at the time, it stressed the importance of both military preparedness and having fun, two values she appreciated. Juliette and Baden-Powell became close friends and spent a lot of time together over the next year.

In August 1911, Gordon Low became involved with the Girl Guides, an girl-serving offshoot of the Boy Scouts, headed by Agnes Baden-Powell, Sir Robert Baden Powell's sister. She formed a Girl Guides patrol near her home in Scotland, where she encouraged the members to become self-sufficient by learning how to spin wool and care for livestock. She also taught them knot tying, map reading, knitting, cooking, and first aid, while her friends in the military instructed them in drilling, signaling, and camping. She organized two new Girl Guides patrols in London when she visited for the winter of 1911.

Start of the American Girl Guides
In 1912, Gordon Low and Baden-Powell took a trip to the United States to spread the scouting movement. She hoped to bring it to her hometown, Savannah, to help girls learn practical skills and build character. When she arrived, she called her cousin Nina Pape, a local educator, saying, "I've got something for the girls of Savannah, and all America, and all the world, and we're going to start it tonight." Soon after, in March 1912, Juliette formed the first two American Girl Guides patrols, registering 18 girls.

The early growth of the movement in the United States was due to Gordon Low's extensive social connections and early work to recruit new members and leaders, among them her family and friends. She also advertised in newspapers and magazines. Baden-Powell put her in touch with people interested in Girl Guiding, including Louise Carnegie. After forming the first American troops, Juliette described herself as "deep in Girl Guides," and, by the next year, she had released the first American Girl Guides manual, entitled How Girls Can Help Their Country, based on Scouting for Boys by Robert Baden-Powell and How Girls Can Help to Build Up the Empire by Agnes Baden-Powell.

Gordon Low established the first headquarters in a remodeled carriage house, behind the Savannah home she had inherited from her husband. The headquarters contained meeting rooms for the local Girl Guide patrols, while the lot outside provided space for marching or signaling drills and sports, including basketball. Edmund Strudwick Nash, who rented the main house from Gordon Low, offered to pay rent on the carriage house as his contribution to the organization, becoming one of the American Girl Guide's first benefactors. Nash's son, Ogden Nash, immortalized "Mrs Low's House" in one of his poems.

Gordon Low traveled along the East Coast, spreading Girl Guiding to other communities, before returning to Savannah to speak with President Taft, who would be visiting her home. She hoped to convince him that his daughter, Helen, should become a patron for the Girl Guides, but was unsuccessful.

American Girl Scouts
Many competing organizations for girls that claimed to be the closest model to Boy Scouting were forming, and Gordon Low believed that gaining support from prominent people would help legitimize her organization as the official sister organization to the Boy Scouts. Her biggest competition was the Camp Fire Girls, which was formed in part by James E. West, the Chief executive of the Boy Scouts of America, and a strong proponent of strict gender roles. In March 1912, Gordon Low wrote to the Camp Fire Girls, inviting them to merge into the Girl Guides, but they declined even after Baden-Powell suggested that they reconsider. West considered many of the Girl Guides activities to be gender-inappropriate, and he was concerned that the public would question the masculinity of the Boy Scouts if the girls participated in similar activities.

Renaming the organization 
Although the Girl Guides were growing, the Camp Fire Girls were doing so at a faster rate, so Gordon Low traveled to England to seek counsel from the British Girl Guides. By the time she returned to America, in 1913, she had a plan to spread Girl Guiding nationwide by changing the name from Girl Guides to Girl Scouts, establishing a national headquarters, and recruiting patrons outside of Georgia. Upon returning to Savannah, she learned that the Savannah Girl Guides had already renamed themselves to Girl Scouts because "Scout" reminded them of America's pioneer ancestry. West objected to the name change, saying that it trivialized the name of scout and would cause older Boy Scouts to quit. Baden-Powell supported Gordon Low's use of the term "scout," although he preferred the term "guide" for the British Girl Guides.

In 1913, Gordon Low set up the Girl Scouts national headquarters in Washington, D.C., and hired her friend Edith Johnston as National Executive Secretary. The national headquarters served as the "central information dispenser" for Girl Scouting, as well as the place where girls could purchase their badges and the newly published handbook, How Girls Can Help Their Country.

Gordon Low recruited leaders and members in various states and spoke with every group that she could. Around the same time, she designed and patented the trefoil badge, although West claimed that the trefoil belonged to the Boy Scouts and the Girl Scouts had no right using it. She traveled back to London in the summer, where she met King George V and Queen Mary of Teck, and received the Girl Guide Thanks Badge from Princess Louise for promoting Guiding.

Gordon Low also formed the Honorary Committee of Girl Scouts and elected her family and friends to the committee. By using her connections, she was able to convince Susan Ludlow Parish, Eleanor Roosevelt's godmother; Mina Miller Edison, the wife of Thomas Edison; and Bertha Woodward, the wife of the House of Representatives majority leader, to become patrons. Although she had received support from many patrons, Gordon still funded most Girl Scout expenses herself.

World War I
At the start of World War I, Gordon Low rented Castle Menzies, in Scotland, and let a family of Belgian refugees move in temporarily.

When she arrived, she continued her work for the Girl Scouts. At the time, the organization had 73 patrons and 2,400 registered members. Gordon Low decided to build a stronger central organization for the Girl Scouts by writing a new constitution that formed an executive committee and a National Council. She held the first National Council meeting under the new name, Girl Scouts, Inc. on June 10, 1915, and was elected the organization's founding president.

The Girl Scouts expanded after the United States entered World War I. Gordon Low publicized the Girl Scouts through newspapers, magazines, events, and film. In 1916, she relocated Girl Scout headquarters from Washington, DC, to New York City. The same year, she returned to England to fundraise and open a home for relatives of wounded soldiers, where she volunteered three nights per week. By November, she was back in the United States, continuing her work with the Girl Scouts.

In response to the thrift program, enacted by the United States Food Administration with the goal of teaching women how to conserve food, Girl Scouts in Washington, DC, began growing and harvesting their own food and canning perishable goods. Herbert Hoover wrote to Gordon Low, thanking her for the contributions of the Girl Scouts and expressing hope that others would follow suit. She responded by organizing Girl Scouts to help the Red Cross by making surgical dressings and knitting clothing for soldiers. They also picked oakum, swept workrooms, created scrapbooks for wounded soldiers, and made smokeless trench candles for soldiers to heat their food.

By the end of 1917, Gordon Low convinced Lou Henry Hoover to become the Girl Scouts' National Vice President and Edith Bolling Galt Wilson, President Woodrow Wilson's second wife, to become its Honorary President.

Expanding internationally
Following World War I, interest in the Girl Guides began to increase in many different countries. In response, Olave Baden-Powell, the Chief Guide, created the International Council of Girl Guides and Girl Scouts as a way to bring together the different communities of Guides and Scouts across the world. The first meeting took place at the Girl Guide headquarters in London, which Gordon Low attended as the United States representative.

Gordon Low stepped down as the National President of the Girl Scouts in 1920 to devote more of her time to promoting Guiding and Scouting internationally. She attended as many meetings of the International Council as she could, and underwrote the travel of foreign delegates, so that they would could also attend. And she assisted Olave Baden-Powell in converting 65 acres of land into a campsite for the Girl Guides. Gordon Low furnished a bungalow near the main house and named it "The Link" to signify the bond between the British Girl Guides and the American Girl Scouts.

While no longer the President, Gordon Low remained an active presence in the organization. She worked on and appeared in The Golden Eaglet, the first Girl Scout movie. At a fundraising campaign in New York during Girl Scout Week, she dropped pamphlets onto a crowd of people from an airplane. On October 31 that same week, the Girl Scouts celebrated the first Founder's Day, a day to honor Gordon Low and her accomplishments. In 1922, the Girl Scout convention took place in Savannah, her hometown. She helped plan and organize the convention by renting an auditorium, arranging for appearances by professional athletes, the mayor, and the school superintendent, and hiring a film company. After the 1922 convention, she began planning Cloudlands, a camping facility in Cloudland, Georgia, designed to train leaders and girls together. Cloudlands was later renamed Camp Juliette Low.

Breast cancer death

Gordon Low developed breast cancer in 1923 but kept it a secret. She caught the flu after an operation to remove the malignant lumps, leaving her bed-ridden until February 1924. When she recovered, she resumed her work with the American Girl Scouts and the International Council. She secretly had two more operations to try to cure her breast cancer, but was informed in 1925 that she had about six months to live. She continued to do work for the Girl Scouts, and even sneaked away during her recovery from surgery to make a speech at the organization's regional conference in Richmond.

Gordon Low traveled to Liverpool, where Dr. William Blair-Bell was developing a treatment for cancer. She tried it, an IV containing a solution of colloidal lead. The treatment was unsuccessful, and she spent her 66th birthday fighting off lead poisoning. She traveled back to the United States to meet with her doctor, who informed her that she did not have much longer to live. She went to the Low home in Savannah, where she spent her last few months. Gordon Low died in Savannah on January 17, 1927, at the age of 66. An honor guard of Girl Scouts escorted her casket to her funeral at Christ Church the next day. 250 Girl Scouts left school early that day to attend her funeral and burial at Laurel Grove Cemetery. Gordon Low was buried in her Girl Scout uniform with a note in her pocket stating "You are not only the first Girl Scout, but the best Girl Scout of them all." Her tombstone read, "Now abideth faith, hope, and love, but the greatest of these is love."

Legacy

In 1948, a postage stamp honoring Gordon Low, Scott catalogue number 974, was issued by the United States. Over 63 million were printed, making it a common issue. At the time, the Post Office had a policy of not honoring civic organizations. It took a joint resolution of Congress, with the approval of President Harry S. Truman, to produce the stamp for her. (The National Postal Museum suggests that it may have helped that Bess Truman was honorary president of the Girl Scouts.)

Gordon Low's home in Savannah is visited by Girl Scouts from all over the world. In 1965, her birthplace was listed as a National Historic Landmark.

Gordon Low also donated a seven-acre park in Savannah, which bears her name. The park (originally part of her family homestead, the remainder of which was developed into the Gordonston neighborhood, which includes a road named Kinzie Avenue after Low's family) has been the center of long-running disputes between Gordonston residents and non-residents as to whether the park was donated to the residents of Gordonston, or to the residents of Savannah at large, even to the point of disagreement over the park's name. The park figures prominently in Karen Kingsbury's 2013 novel The Chance.

In 1979, she was inducted into the National Women's Hall of Fame.

On May 29, 2012, the Girl Scouts' centennial anniversary was commemorated, with Gordon Low receiving the Presidential Medal of Freedom.

She was inducted into the Savannah Women of Vision investiture in 2016.

Camp Juliette Low in Cloudland, Georgia, bears the name of its founder.

Her birthday, October 31, is commemorated by the Girl Scouts each year as "Founder's Day".

She was also awarded two patents, a utility patent for a "Liquid Container for Use with Garbage Cans or the Like", Patent 1,124,925, and a design patent, D45234, for the trefoil Girl Scout Badge.

In 1999, the city of Savannah named its ferry service the Savannah Belles Ferry after five of Savannah's notable women, including Juliette Gordon Low.

In 2016, the first official Girl Scout trail honoring Juliette Gordon Low was created by a Girl Scout for her Gold Award project. The trail is located in Westwinds Metropark in Holland, Ohio.

Footnotes

References

Further reading

 
 
 "Juliette Gordon Low" Biography.com. Retrieved on December 5, 2012.
 
 National Women's Hall of Fame

External links

 Juliette Gordon Low Birthplace
 Girl Scouts of The USA
 
 
 
 
 Juliette Gordon Low papers from the Digital Library of Georgia
 Spring, Kelly. "Juliette Gordon Low". National Women's History Museum. 2017.

1860 births
1927 deaths
Deaths from breast cancer
People from Savannah, Georgia
American deaf people
Girl Scouts of the USA people
Recipients of the Silver Fish Award
Presidential Medal of Freedom recipients
Scouting pioneers
Organization founders